Kenan Olcay (born 30 november 1913, date of death unknown) was a Greco-Roman wrestler from Turkey. He won a silver medal in the flyweight class at the 1948 Olympics.

References

External links
 

1913 births
Year of death missing
Wrestlers at the 1948 Summer Olympics
Turkish male sport wrestlers
Olympic wrestlers of Turkey
Olympic silver medalists for Turkey
Olympic medalists in wrestling
Medalists at the 1948 Summer Olympics
20th-century Turkish people